Jeremy Edwardson (born March 25, 1979) is an American singer/songwriter, record producer, audio engineer, mixer, and former lead vocalist of the Seattle-based band, The Myriad. He owns and operates The Soundhouse recording studio in his hometown of Redding, California. Edwardson is a 1997 graduate of Central Valley High School in Shasta Lake, California.

Discography

Ian Mcintosh "Alive" released May 2009 (also credited as mixer)

Jeff Abercrombie "Everything Grace" released April 2009 (also credited as mixer)

Wesley Jensen "Battles" released March 2009 (also credited as mixer)

Sunbears "Dream Happy Dreams" released March 2009 (engineer only)

David Walker "Closer Than Angels) released December 2008

Kristene Mueller "Those Who Dream" released December 2008 (also credited as mixer)

Ian Mcintosh "You Are" Single released October 2008 (also credited as mixer)

The Myriad "With Arrows, With Poise" released May 2008

Wesley Jensen "Stories" released April 2008 (also credited as mixer)

The Myriad "A Clean Shot" Single released January 2008

The Myriad "Prelude to Arrows" released October 2007 (also credited as mixer)

The Myriad "Perfect" a Smashing Pumpkins Tribute released July 2007

Ian Mcintosh "Awakened" released July 2007

Wesley Jensen "Pirates and Cowboys" released July 2007 (also credited as mixer)

Ardent "Sounds" released June 2007 (mixer/engineer)

Transition "Get There" released April 2006

Constancy "The Apathy Tree" released March 2006 (also credited as mixer)

The Myriad "You Can't Trust A Ladder" released June 2005 (engineer only)

Maktub "Say What You Mean" released April 2005 (asst engineer)

The Myriad "Self Titled" released June 2004 (also credited as mixer)

Deborah Brown "Heather In The Midst" released May 2004 (editing, mastering)

References

American rock singers
People from Redding, California
Living people
1979 births
21st-century American singers
21st-century American male singers